The straw-tailed whydah (Vidua fischeri) is a species of bird in the family Viduidae.
It is found in Ethiopia, Kenya, Somalia, South Sudan, Tanzania, and Uganda.
Its natural habitat is dry savanna. Like all other whydah species, the straw-tailed whydah is a brood parasite.

References

straw-tailed whydah
Birds of East Africa
straw-tailed whydah
Taxonomy articles created by Polbot